Onthophagus nuchicornis is a species of dung beetle in the family Scarabaeidae. It is found in Europe and North America. Though Onthophagus nuchicornis is listed as "Vulnerable" in the United Kingdom, it is a common and abundant species in North America. It has been used as a model organism for ecotoxicological studies of ivermectin, where different biological endpoints (e.g. dung burial) are stimulated at low levels of ivermectin exposure, but impaired at high levels of ivermectin exposure.

References

Further reading

External links

 

Scarabaeinae
Articles created by Qbugbot
Beetles described in 1758
Taxa named by Carl Linnaeus